The Judo Federation of India (JFI) is the national sports federation for judo in India. The JFI was established in 1965, and received affiliation from the International Judo Federation during the same year. The JFI organized the first National Judo Championship at Hyderabad in 1966. An Indian team participated in an international judo competition for the first time at the 1986 Asian Games in Seoul, which was also the first time judo was included as an event at the Asian Games. India won four bronze medals in its debut international judo tournament. Indian judokas have also participated at the Olympic Games.

The JFI opened its first Judo Academy in Sonepat, Haryana. The JFI opened its second training centre at the Anantapur Sports Academy on 30 May 2015. The third Judo Academy was opened at Dev Sanskriti Vishwavidyalaya in Haridwar, Uttarakhand in July 2015. A JFI training center was opened in Zemabawk North, Mizoram in May 2017.

The JFI, in association with the IJF, organized a two-week judo development programme in October 2016 across 9 North Indian cities.

References

Sports organizations established in 1965
1965 establishments in Delhi
Judo organizations
Sports governing bodies in India
Organisations based in Delhi